Boram is a village in the Boram CD block in the Dhalbhum subdivision of the Purbi Singhum district in the Indian state of Jharkhand.

Geography

Location

Area overview
The area shown in the map “forms a part of the Chota Nagpur Plateau and is a hilly upland tract”.  The main rivers draining the district are the Subarnarekha and the Kharkai. The area lying between Jamshedpur and Ghatshila is the main industrial mining zone. The rest of the district is primarily agricultural. In the district, as of 2011,  56.9% of the population lives in the rural areas and a high 43.1% lives in the urban areas.

Note: The map alongside presents some of the notable locations in the district. All places marked in the map are linked in the larger full screen map.

Civic administration
There is a police station at Boram.

The headquarters of Boram CD block is located at Boram village.

Demographics
According to the 2011 Census of India, Boram had a total population of 3,314, of which 1,760 (53%) were males and 1,554 (47%) were females. Population in the age range 0–6 years was 485. The total number of literate persons in Boram was 1,807 (63.87% of the population over 6 years).

(*For language details see Boram block#Language and religion)

Education
Adibasi High School is a Bengali-medium coeducational institution established in 1963. It has facilities for teaching in classes IX and X. The school has a library with 773 books.

References

Villages in East Singhbhum district